Theodor Grosse (1829–91) was a German historical painter.  He was born at Dresden and studied at the Dresden Academy under Bendemann.  For his encaustic decorations in the castle of Count Solms Wildenfels on the Mulde, he was awarded the traveling scholarship of the Dresden Academy.  After several years in Italy Grosse returned to fresco the eastern loggia of the Leipzig Museum.  In 1867 he was made professor at the Dresden Academy.  His other works include:  
 "Leda with the Swan" (1852, Dresden Academy)
 "Scenes from the Myth of Bacchus" (1877, foyer of the New Theatre, Dresden)
 "The Visit of the Three Angels to Abraham" (1863, Museum, Leipzig)
 "Arrival of the Souls in Purgatory" (1879, after Dante, Dresden Gallery)

See also
 List of German painters

References
 

1829 births
1891 deaths
19th-century German painters
19th-century German male artists
German male painters
Academic staff of the Dresden Academy of Fine Arts
People from the Kingdom of Saxony